Helen Dunmore FRSL (12 December 1952 – 5 June 2017) was a British poet, novelist, and short story and children's writer. 

Her best known works include the novels Zennor in Darkness, A Spell of Winter and The Siege, and her last book of poetry Inside the Wave. She won the inaugural Orange Prize for Fiction, the National Poetry Competition, and posthumously the Costa Book Award.

Biography
Dunmore was born in Beverley, Yorkshire, in 1952, the second of four children of Betty (née Smith) and Maurice Dunmore.
She attended Sutton High School, London and  Nottingham Girls' High School, then direct grant grammar schools.

She studied English at the University of York, and lived in Finland for two years (1973–75) and worked as a teacher. She lived after that in Bristol. Dunmore was a Fellow of the Royal Society of Literature (FRSL). Some of Dunmore's children's books are included in reading schemes for use in schools.

In March 2017, she published her last novel, Birdcage Walk, as well as an article about mortality for The Guardian written after she was diagnosed with terminal cancer. She died on 5 June 2017. Her final poetry collection Inside the Wave, published in April 2017 shortly before her death, posthumously won the Poetry and overall Book of the Year awards in the 2017 Costa Book Awards.

Personal life 
Dunmore's husband Frank Charnley, whom she married in 1980, is a lawyer. Dunmore had a son, daughter and stepson, and three grandchildren at the time of her death.

Awards and honours 
 1987: Poetry Book Society Choice, The Raw Garden
 1994: McKitterick Prize, Zennor in Darkness
 1996: Orange Prize (inaugural winner), A Spell of Winter
 1990: Cardiff International Poetry Prize
 1997: T. S. Eliot Prize, shortlist, Bestiary
 2010: Man Booker Prize, longlist, The Betrayal
 2010: National Poetry Competition winner, "The Malarkey"
 2015: Walter Scott Prize, shortlist, The Lie
 2017 (posthumously): Costa Book Awards Poetry and Book of the Year Awards, Inside the Wave

Bibliography

Novels 
Zennor in Darkness (1993, McKitterick Prize 1994)
Burning Bright (1994)
A Spell of Winter (1995, Orange Prize 1996)
Talking to the Dead (1996)
Your Blue-Eyed Boy (1998)
With your Crooked Heart (1999)
The Siege (2001, shortlisted for the Whitbread Novel of the Year Award and the Orange Prize 2002)
Mourning Ruby (2003)
House of Orphans (2006)
Counting the Stars (2008)
The Betrayal (2010, longlisted for the Man Booker prize)
The Greatcoat (2012)
The Lie (2014)
Exposure (2016)
An "Exclusive edition for independent bookshops" includes a 14-page essay "On Reading"
Birdcage Walk (2017, longlisted for the Walter Scott Prize 2018)

Short story collections 
Love of Fat Men (1997)
Ice Cream (2000)
Rose, 1944 (2005)
Girl, Balancing and Other Stories (2018)

Young adult books 
Zillah and Me!
The Lilac Tree (first published as Zillah and Me) (2004)
The Seal Cove  (first published as The Zillah Rebellion) (2004)
The Silver Bead (2004)
The Ingo Chronicles
Ingo (2005)
The Tide Knot (2006)
The Deep (2007)
The Crossing of Ingo (2008)
Stormswept (2012)

Children's books 
Going to Egypt (1992)
In the Money (1995)
Go Fox (1996)
Fatal Error (1996)
Amina's Blanket (1996)
Allie's Apples (1997)
Bestiary (1997)
Clyde's Leopard (1998)
Great-Grandma's Dancing Dress (1998)
Brother Brother, Sister Sister (1999)
Allie's Rabbit (1999)
Allie's Away (2000)
Aliens Don't Eat Bacon Sandwiches (2000)
The Ugly Duckling (2001)
Tara's Tree House (2003)
The Ferry Birds (2010)
The Islanders (2011)
The Lonely Sea Dragon (2013)

Poetry collections 
The Apple Fall (Bloodaxe Books, 1983)
The Sea Skater (Bloodaxe Books, 1986)
The Raw Garden (Bloodaxe Books, 1988)
Short Days, Long Nights: New & Selected Poems (Bloodaxe Books, 1991)
Recovering a Body (Bloodaxe Books, 1994)
Secrets (The Bodley Head, 1994) [children's poetry title]
Bestiary (Bloodaxe Books, 1997)
Out of the Blue: Poems 1975–2001 (Bloodaxe Books, 2001)
Snollygoster and Other Poems (Scholastic Press, 2001) [children's poetry title]
Glad of these times (Bloodaxe Books, 2007)
The Malarkey (Bloodaxe Books, 2012)
Inside the Wave (Bloodaxe Books, 2017)

References

External links 

 
 HarperCollins Canada site
 
 

1952 births
2017 deaths
20th-century British novelists
20th-century English women writers
21st-century British novelists
21st-century English women writers
Alumni of the University of York
British children's writers
British women children's writers
British women novelists
British writers of young adult literature
Deaths from cancer in England
English women poets
Fellows of the Royal Society of Literature
People educated at Nottingham Girls' High School
People from Beverley
Women writers of young adult literature